Jet Lag is a 2002 French romantic comedy film starring Juliette Binoche and Jean Reno. It is the second film directed by Danièle Thompson, following Season's Beatings (1999).

Premise
At Charles de Gaulle Airport in Paris, a French beautician (Juliette Binoche) on her way to a new job in Mexico accidentally meets a French chef (Jean Reno) who has been delayed on his way to Germany from his residence in the United States. Labor strikes, bad weather, and pure luck cause the two of them to share a room overnight at the airport Hilton hotel. Their initial mutual indifference and downright hostility evolves into romance and a re-examination of their lives.

Cast
 Juliette Binoche as Rose
 Jean Reno as Félix
 Sergi López as Sergio
 Scali Delpeyrat as The Doctor
 Karine Belly as Air France Attendant
 Raoul Billerey as Félix's Father
 Nadège Beausson-Diagne as A Roissy Passenger
 Alice Taglioni as Ground Hostess
 Jérôme Keen as The Concierge
 Sébastien Lalanne as The Barman
 Michel Lepriol as The Waiter
 M'bembo as Post Office Employee (as Mbembo)
 Laurence Colussi as Hostess
 Lucy Harrison as Hostess
 Rebecca Steele as Hostess

Production
Danièle Thompson originally wrote the script for Miramax Films in the early 1990s with Isabelle Adjani attached to star in an English-language version.

Thompson obtained permission to film at Charles de Gaulle Airport in Paris prior to September 11, 2001. After the terrorist attacks, permission was withdrawn. Thompson then obtained permission to use Lourdes Airport, but was not convinced that viewers would believe it was Charles de Gaulle. Eventually she managed to gain 10 shooting days access to Paris. The rest was filmed on sets and in Libby Airport.

Décalage Horaire is the second collaboration of mother and son writing team Danièle Thompson & Christophe Thompson after the 1999 film La Bûche.

Décalage Horaire is one of the rare comedies in Juliette Binoche's career, after Les Nanas''' (1985) A Couch in New York (1995) and Chocolat'' (2000).

Critical response
On Rotten Tomatoes, the film holds an approval rating of 56%, based on 66 reviews, with an average rating of 5.8/10. The site's critical consensus reads, " A light and fluffy romantic comedy for fans of Juliette Binoche and Jean Reno." On Metacritic the film has a score of 53 out of 100, based on 28 critics, indicating "mixed or average reviews".

Accolades

References

External links
 
 

2002 films
2002 romantic comedy films
Films directed by Danièle Thompson
Films produced by Alain Sarde
Films scored by Éric Serra
Films set in airports
2000s French-language films
French romantic comedy films
2000s French films